Elephantopus tomentosus is a species of perennial flowering plant in the family Asteraceae. It is native to the southeastern United States. It blooms from July to September.

Common names include woolly elephant's foot and devil's grandmother.

References

Vernonieae